This is a list of the winners of the Bavarian Film Awards Prize for best documentary film.

1989 Axel Engstfeld
1990 Donatello & Fosco Dubini, Wolfgang Meyer
1991 Peter Schamoni
1992 Heiner Stadler
1993 Juraj Herz, Dagmar Wagner
1995 Peter Schamoni
1996 Stefan Schwietert
2001 Andres Veiel
2002 Douglas Wolfsperger
2003 Byambasuren Davaa
2005 Philip Gröning
2006 Florian Borchmeyer & Matthias Hentschler
2007 Pepe Danquart
2009 Petra Seeger
2010 Jens Schanze
2011 Arnon Goldfinger
2012 Markus Imhoof
2013 Leopold Grün and Dirk Uhlig
2014 Nadav Schirman
2015 Jens Schanze
2016 Andreas Voigt
2017 Yasemin Şamdereli and Nesrin Şamdereli
2018 Markus Imhoof
2019 Janna Ji Wonders

References
https://www.stmd.bayern.de/wp-content/uploads/2020/08/Bayerische-Filmpreisträger-bis-2020.pdf

Bavarian film awards